Dokarichanchara is a picnic spot and tourist place situated in Khaligarh village, Koksara, Kalahandi, Odisha, India.

Tourism 
About 80 years ago, a temple of God Rama was built in this place. Because of this Ram Navami, a 9-day-long festival, occurs every year, which attracts tourists from throughout Odisha.

Gallery

Gudahandi

Dokarichanchara Waterfalls

Ram Navami

References 

Kalahandi district
Waterfalls of Odisha